Hon Elibeth Acuei is a South Sudanese politician, appointed Minister of Health by his excellency president Salva Kiir Mayardit in 2020 in when she was named into office. Olushayo Olu the world health organisation representative in south Sudan paid a courtesy call on the honourable minister on 27 April 2020

Career 
She welcomed the Chinese Medical Expert Team to South Sudan and received from them newly arrived medical donations for South Sudan at a critical moment of the global fight against the COVID-19. In the same year 2020 Elizabeth declared South Sudan through African Regional Certification Commission for Poliomyelitis Eradication (ARCC) free of wild polio virus.

She was sacked by a presidential decree of Salva Kiir Mayardit after being appointed to the position in 2020 at the beginning of the transitional period. She was replaced as Health minister replaced by Awel Deng, a lawmaker representing SPLA-IO in the peace parliament.

Controversies 
As National Health Minister, Elizabeth Acuei Yor suspended the undersecretary Victoria Anib and replaced her with Samson Paul Baba without making known the investigation process or the motive for suspension.

After three-months, Minister Acuei revoked the suspension after President Salva Kiir and First Vice President Riek Machar requested the minister to reconcile with her junior.

References 

South Sudanese politicians
Women government ministers of South Sudan
Year of birth missing (living people)
Living people